, born on July 9, 1987, in Nagano Prefecture, is a Japanese actor, singer, and model. He is best known for his roles as Shusuke Fuji in Musical: The Prince of Tennis; Sebastian Michaelis in the Black Butler musicals, and Kirikaze in Fuma no Kojiro. He is managed by Ken-On.

Filmography

TV 

Fuuma no Kojirou (Tokyo MX, 2007)  as Kirikaze
Shinsengumi PEACE MAKER (TBS, 2010) as Ichimura Tatsunosuke
Yankee-kun to Megane-chan (TBS, 2010) as Nagasaki (ep 9–10)
Downtown Rocket Season 2 (TBS, 2018)
Yell (NHK, 2020) as Kiyoshi Mitarai
The Way of the Househusband (NTV, 2020) as Tatsuki Sakai
Yakuza Lover (MBS, 2022) as Toshiomi Oya

Stage 
 Fuuma no Kojirou as KirikazeLIVE
 PATi★Night Episode 03 (ZEPP TOKYO)2009 PATi★Night Episode 04 (AKASAKA BLITZ)2009 FULL COLOR VARiATiON ★FIRST ONE MAN LIVE (LIQUID ROOM)2010 FULL SUMMER VACATiON (SHIBUYA 0-EAST, NAGOYA E.L.L, OSAKA MUSE)2010 Acoustic Live ENDLESS SUMMER VACATiON (SHINJUKU FACE)2010Musical PHANTOM (as Earl Philippe de Chandon)(2010 11/2～)Musical ELISABETH (Chunichi Theatre) 2012 8/3~26 Kuroshitsuji Musical 3: Lycoris that blazes the earth (2015 rerun as Sebastian Michaelis)
 Kuroshitsuji Musical 4: Noah's Ark Circus (2016) as Sebastian Michaelis
 Kuroshitsuji Musical 5: Tango on the Campania (2018) as Sebastian Michaelis

TENIMYU: THE PRINCE OF TENNIS MUSICAL SERIES (as Shusuke Fuji)The Prince of Tennis Musical: The Progressive Match Higa Chuu feat. Rikkai (In Winter 2007–2008)The Prince of Tennis Musical: Dream Live 5th (2008)The Prince of Tennis Musical: The Imperial Presence Hyotei Gakuen feat. Higa Chuu (2008) The Prince of Tennis Musical: The Treasure Match Shitenhouji feat. Hyotei Gakuen (2008-2009)The Prince of Tennis Musical: Dream Live 6th (2009)

 Movies 
　
 The Way of the Househusband (2022) as Tatsuki Sakai
 My Boyfriend in Orange (2022) as Kazuma Shindō

 Discography 
 FULL COLOR VARiATiON (May 26, 2010) Kako no Sora, Mirai no Boku (2010) I (August 28, 2009) Sunday (April 1, 2009) COLOR VARiATiON (October 28, 2009) PASTEL GRAFFiTi (October 29, 2008) Fuma no Kojiro Character Songs Collection (December 19, 2007) DVD 
 MEN'S DVD "ROAD" (released February 20, 2008) FURUKAWA YūTA 1ST ONE MAN LiVE 'FULL COLOR VARiATiON (released May 25, 2010)''

CD 
Fuma no Kojiro Character Songs Collection (December 19, 2007)
PASTEL GRAFFiTi (October 29, 2008)
COLOR VARiATiOn (October 28, 2009)
SUMMER VACATiON (August 25, 2010)
STUDIO SUNSHINE (February 5, 2013)

DVD 
PATi Night Episode 03 (released August 26, 2009)
MEN'S DVD "ROAD" (released February 20, 2008)

Photobook 
Tokyo Jitensha Monogatari Photo Movie Book (2009)
MEN'S Photobook "Lu" (March 19, 2008)
Musical The Prince Of Tennis Photo Book (2009)

References

External links 
Official site
Official profile @ Toyota office
Official blog and news site

1987 births
Living people
Japanese male dancers
Japanese male film actors
Japanese male models
Japanese male musical theatre actors
Japanese male pop singers
Japanese male singer-songwriters
Japanese singer-songwriters
Japanese male television actors
Musicians from Nagano Prefecture
21st-century Japanese male actors
21st-century Japanese singers
21st-century Japanese male singers